Liberty Holdings Limited is a South African financial services and property holding company that focuses on Insurance and Asset Management with registered head office in Johannesburg, South Africa at Liberty Centre, 1 Ameshoff St., Braamfontein. 

Liberty has operations in South Africa, Kenya, Namibia and other in 16 African countries. South African banking firm Standard Bank Group owns 55% of the Liberty Group.

History 
The company was founded in South Africa as the Liberty Life Association of Africa Ltd in 1957, by entrepreneur and philanthropist Sir Donald Gordon.

See also 
 Old Mutual
 Standard Bank

References 

Financial services companies of South Africa
Companies based in Johannesburg
1957 establishments in South Africa
Financial services companies established in 1957